Saphine Kirenga (born 25 September) is a Rwandan film actress. One of the most popular actresses in Rwanda Television (RTV), she has appeared in films such as The Chains of Love, Dreams, Sakabaka, Rwasibo, Seburikoko, Urugamba and The Secret of Happiness.  She is also a nurse by profession.

Personal life
Saphine was born in Rwanda. Her mother is also a popular Rwandan film actress.

She has engaged to popular musician Sebera Eric. Sebera was the manager of Rafiki Coga in 2007 and 2008. However, after few months, the relationship was broken and Sebera started dating Uwineza Ruburika Nicole.

Career
In 2017, she acted in the television serial Mutoni and then in Sakabaka. After the success in the serial, she was selected for the short film The Secret of Happiness where Saphine featured the role 'Eva'. In 2016, she won the award for the Best Actress 2016.

In 2019, she made the film Shady Commitment which won the award for the best Feature Film at the inaugural Rwanda International Movie Awards (RIMA) in March 2020. At the ceremony, Saphine was also adjudged Best Actress of the Year for her role in Shady Commitment.

Filmography

References

External links
 
 Rwanda international movie awards
 Kuri uyu wa Gatanu abakunzi ba filime baramurikirwa iyitwa

Rwandan actresses
Living people
Year of birth missing (living people)
People from Kigali